Captain Arthur Maitland Byng (26 October 1872 – 14 September 1914) was an English army officer and cricketer who was a right-handed batsman. He was killed in the early part of World War I.

Cricket
Byng represented Jamaica in five first-class matches in the 1896/97 Jamaican season, making his debut against British Guiana. His final game for Jamaica came against AA Priestley's XI.

Upon returning to England Byng joined Hampshire in three first-class matches, making his debut for the club against Kent. Byng would play two more games for the club against Warwickshire and Northamptonshire.

Outside first-class cricket Byng was a well known club cricketer. In 1905 playing for Hampshire Hogs against the Royal Navy, Byng scored 204 runs in partnership with D. A. Steele; the two put on 335 runs for the first wicket. He was also known as a batsman for the Army.

Military career
Byng was commissioned a second lieutenant in the West Indies Regiment on 28 September 1895, promoted to lieutenant on 14 October 1897, and to captain on 27 June 1900. He transferred to the Royal Fusiliers on 16 March 1901. He served in the Second Boer War in 1902, being employed in the Mounted Infantry; and took part in operations in Transvaal, Orange River Colony and Cape Colony from January to May 1902. Following the end of the war that month, he left Cape Town on the SS Scot in early September, and returned to the United Kingdom. For his service, he received the King's medal (with four clasps). On his return he was back as a regular officer in his regiment.

He was employed with the Egyptian Army from 3 November 1903 to 26 August 1905 and from 20 November 1908 to 19 May 1912, following which he was Adjutant of the Special reserve. HE served in the First World War as a captain in the Royal Fusiliers, and was stationed on the Western Front. On 14 September 1914 Byng was killed in action near the French village of Vailly during the First Battle of the Aisne. While conducting reconnaissance on German positions using his field glasses, Byng was shot in the throat and died instantly.

References

External links
Arthur Byng at Cricinfo
Arthur Byng at CricketArchive
Matches and detailed statistics for Arthur Byng at CricketArchive

1872 births
1914 deaths
People from Southsea
English cricketers
Jamaica cricketers
Hampshire cricketers
British Army personnel of World War I
Royal Fusiliers officers
British military personnel killed in World War I
Maitland family
Military personnel from Portsmouth